The 1840 Delaware gubernatorial election was held on November 3, 1840. Whig Governor Cornelius Comegys was unable to seek re-election to a second term. Former State Representative William B. Cooper ran as the Whig nominee to succeed Comegys and faced Democratic nominee Warren B. Jefferson in the general election. Cooper won the largest victory in a gubernatorial election since 1819, and was ushered into office with a sizable Whig majority in the legislature.

General election

Results

References

Bibliography
 
 
 

1840
Delaware
Gubernatorial